The 2007 WNBA Draft was the league's annual process for determining which teams receive the rights to negotiate with players entering the league.

The first phase, held January 8, 2007 via conference call, was a dispersal draft from the roster of the Charlotte Sting, which folded on January 3. This was the first dispersal draft since before the 2004 season, after the Cleveland Rockers folded. The teams selected in inverse order of their 2006 won-loss record, without regard to the results of the WNBA draft lottery. All Sting players were available except for unrestricted free agents Allison Feaster and Tammy Sutton-Brown.

The main draft was held on April 4, 2007, inside the Renaissance Hotel on Cleveland's Public Square, the day after the 2007 NCAA Women's Division I Basketball Tournament ended.

The previous year's draft was held in Boston the night before the championship game of the 2006 NCAA women's basketball tournament, which was also in Boston. This marked the first WNBA draft ever held outside of New Jersey.

A lottery was held on October 26, 2006 among the teams with the worst records in the previous season to determine the order of the top six picks in the first round of the draft. As in the NBA Draft, the teams' chances were weighted so that the team with the worst record, in this case the Chicago Sky, had the best chance of receiving the top pick. The lottery was used to determine only the top two picks, with picks 3 through 6 going to the other lottery teams in inverse order of record. The Phoenix Mercury, despite having the best record of the six teams involved and thus the worst mathematical chance of winning, drew the top pick. It was the first time since the institution of the lottery for the 2002 Draft that the top pick was earned by the team with the worst mathematical chance of winning. Also for the first time, the team with the second-worst odds of earning the top pick, in this case the San Antonio Silver Stars, received the second pick. The remaining first-round picks, plus all picks in the second and third rounds, are allocated in inverse order of regular-season record, without regard to playoff results (as in the NBA Draft).

Key

Dispersal Draft

College draft

Round 1

Round 2

Round 3

References
General

Specific

Women's National Basketball Association Draft
Draft
WNBA Draft